86 class may refer to:

British Rail Class 86
DRG Class 86
New South Wales 86 class locomotive - electric